This is a timeline that show the development of Chinese music by genre and region. It covers the historic China as well as the geographic areas of Taiwan, Hong Kong and Macau.

Dynastic periods

Zhou Dynasty
 System of formal music yayue established.
 Lyrics of folk songs recorded.
 Decline of yayue by the end of the Spring and Autumn period, increased popularity of new music from Wey and Zheng states.

Qin to Han Dynasty

 Establishment of the Music Bureau to collect folk music.

Sui to Tang Dynasty
 Founding of various academies and music departments - 
 The Great Music Bureau (大樂署) responsible for yayue and yanyue (燕樂, entertainment music and dance for banquet)
The Royal Academy founded by Emperor Gaozu
"Pear Garden", an acting and music academy founded by Emperor Xuanzong.
The Drum and Pipes Bureau (鼓吹署) responsible for ceremonial music.
 Influence from Central Asian, Persian and Indian music.
 Oldest surviving notated music in China - Youlan.

Song to Yuan Dynasty
 Revival of yayue due to the revival of Neo-Confucianism
 Increasing popularity of Chinese opera such as nanxi opera and zaju theatre.
 The artform of Ci poetry which is meant to be sung reached its zenith in the Song Dynasty.

Ming Dynasty
 Kunqu opera.

Qing Dynasty
 Development of Peking opera. 
 Beginning of New Music in late the 19th century under influence of Western music.

1900s
Hong Kong:
 Popular English and western classical music grew with British influence.

1910s
Republic of China:
 The dynastic period ends. New China tries to find a national anthem.
 Beginning of active development of New Music in New Culture Movement.

1920s
Republic of China:
 Shidaiqu started by Li Jinhui, which forms the basis of all Chinese pop music genres such as C-pop, mandopop and cantopop.

1930s
Republic of China:
 Heyday of Shidaiqu in Shanghai which lasted until the 1940s.
 Development of modern Chinese orchestra.

Taiwan:
 Japanese enka influence Hokkien pop for Taiwanese people.

1940s
People's Republic of China:
 The Chinese Communist Party (CCP) labeled pop music as yellow music (pornography).
 CCP promote national music.
 Government control of music via censorship begins.

1950s
People's Republic of China:
 Baak Doi leaves China in 1952 and relocates to Hong Kong.
 Mao Zedong and CCP evolved patriotic music into revolutionary music.

Hong Kong:
 Continuation of Shidaiqu in Hong Kong.

Republic of China / Taiwan:
 Development of Taiwanese mandopop.
 Native Hokkien pop phased out by Kuomintang in favor of mandopop.

1960s
Hong Kong:
 Decline of Shidaiqu.
 Popularity English pop around mid-1960s but beginning to fade by the late 1960s.
 Beginning of cantopop in the late 1960s with Roman Tam as the father of the new genre.
 Popularizing of Huangmei tone.
 Popularizing of Hong Kong musical tongue twister.

1970s
ROC Taiwan:
 Teresa Teng expanded mandopop in Taiwan. Beats censorship in the mainland.

Hong Kong:
 Increasing popularity of cantopop.

1980s
People's Republic of China:
 Tiananmen Square led to the popularizing of Northwest Wind.
 Northwest wind became prison song.
 China begins the importation of gangtai music.

1990s
People's Republic of China:
 Prison song became Chinese rock with Cui Jian as the father of the new genre.
 Popularity of gangtai music.

Hong Kong SAR:
 Karaoke culture begins.

ROC Taiwan
 Hokkien pop re-emergence.

2000s
People's Republic of China:
 Punk rock begins in China.

Hong Kong SAR and ROC Taiwan
 Chinese hip hop begins in Hong Kong and Taiwan.

2010s
2015: Establishment of the Billboard China V Chart'''.

See also
 Timeline of Chinese history
 Timeline of Hong Kong history
 Music of China
 Music of Hong Kong
 Music of Taiwan

References 

Chinese music history
Chinese music
Chinese music